Jerada (Berber: Jrada, ⵊⵔⴰⴷⴰ, Arabic: جْرادة) is a city in the Oriental region of northeastern Morocco. It is located close to the border with Algeria.

Jerada is the capital city of Jerada Province. According to the 2014 census, the municipality had a population of 43,506 people living in 8,953 households.

History
Jerada has been the location of various instances of civil unrest in Morocco. It was one of the sites of the 1948 Anti-Jewish Riots in Oujda and Jerada in which thirty-nine Jewish people were killed, thirty severely injured and others sustained minor injuries.

The 2017–2018 Moroccan protests started in Jerada after two brothers died in a tunnel accident when a mine flooded after miners broke through into a well.

References

Populated places in Jerada Province
Provincial capitals in Morocco
Municipalities of Morocco